The Crossroads is an unincorporated community in Calhoun County, Illinois, United States.

References

Unincorporated communities in Calhoun County, Illinois
Unincorporated communities in Illinois